Central Park is located in Wallasey, Merseyside, England. The park was the site of Liscard Hall, which was set ablaze by local vandals on 7 July 2008. The damage to the hall was too severe and the once grand house had to be demolished. The hall was the home of Sir John Tobin, a former Mayor of Liverpool. The park has football and cricket grounds.

External links 

 
 Central Park Wallasey  website

Parks and commons in the Metropolitan Borough of Wirral